The Saint is a music venue located in Asbury Park, New Jersey, United States. It is reminiscent of places like The Cellar Door in Washington, DC, CBGB, CB's 313 Gallery, and The Living Room in New York City, and features live, original music. The Saint was founded by Adam Jon Weisberg along with business partner Scott Stamper, and opened its doors on November 18, 1994. Stamper bought out Weisberg in 2013 and became the sole owner. He is also a co-founder (along with Weisberg and Gordon Brown) of the Wave Gathering Music Festival.

Background

The Saint was an early site of the annual Asbury Park Music Awards ceremony founded by Stamper in collaboration with Pete Mantas. The awards ceremony, modeled after the Grammy Awards, features the presentation of awards between performances of live, original music. The event was originally called "The Golden T-Bird Awards" and was first held in 1993 at a small club on Main Street called the T-Bird Cafe. The awards ceremony was later moved to The Saint and renamed "The Asbury Music Awards" in 1995. When the event's attendance exceeded The Saint's capacity, the ceremony was rotated among larger venues, including The Fastlane, The Tradewinds, and The Stone Pony.  The Saint remains a co-sponsor of the event.

The Saint has been credited with helping to keep the local music scene alive when newspapers said that the heyday of live music was over, and even The Stone Pony intermittently closed. It has been described as a landmark, the bedrock of the Asbury Park music scene, and an important venue for introducing emerging artists. It has also been called Asbury Park's "rock n’roll version of “Cheers,” where musicians and fans hang out together and everybody does know your name."

The Saint showcases a variety of new and well-known, local, national, and international acts that are touring through the region. The club is more of a concert venue than a bar, and has been described by music critics as one of the top five rock clubs in New Jersey.

The Saint has recording capability.

The nature of the acts and links to their websites are posted on the Saint's website so that potential patrons can preview them.

Some bands also perform on 90.5 The Night, Brookdale Public Radio before they play the Saint.

The shows designated "Asbury Cafe" are acoustic, seated shows during which talking is not permitted while the acts are playing.

Age, attire, and nature of the audience varies with the bands, but is generally eclectic.

Notable acts

Notable acts who have performed there include The Airborne Toxic Event, Nicole Atkins, Ben Folds Five, Bif Naked, Tracy Bonham, Cake, Cannibal Corpse, Ryan Cassata, Jen Chapin, Citizen Cope, Cowboy Mouth, Creed, The Dandy Warhols, Kimya Dawson, Deftones, Joe DeRosa, Dub Trio, The Duke Spirit, Everlast, Finger Eleven, Five for Fighting, The Ghost of a Saber Tooth Tiger, Green Jellÿ, Guster, Robert Hazard, HelenaMaria, Hoobastank, Incubus, Jewel, Freedy Johnston, Joydrop, Kings of Leon, LP, The Lemonheads, Tony Levin, Toby Lightman, Lunachicks, Marcy Playground, Matthew Good Band, Anne McCue, Shannon McNally, Mod Fun, Modern English, Moe, Allie Moss, Moxy Früvous, Mucky Pup, Nada Surf, Leona Naess, Mieka Pauley, The Pierces, Rachel Platten, Queens of the Stone Age, Joey Ramone, Scars on 45, Maia Sharp, Kenny Wayne Shepherd, April Smith and the Great Picture Show, Bruce Springsteen, Stereophonics, The String Cheese Incident, Kasim Sulton, Tegan and Sara, The The, They Might Be Giants, The Trashcan Sinatras, Derek Trucks, Ween, and Wussy.

See also
 Wave Gathering

References

External links 
 The Saint
 90.5 the Night, Brookdale Public Radio

Nightclubs in New Jersey
Jersey Shore sound
Music venues in New Jersey
Tourist attractions in Monmouth County, New Jersey
Asbury Park, New Jersey